Tropisternus collaris, the collared water scavenger beetle, is a species of water scavenger beetle in the family Hydrophilidae. It is found in the Caribbean, North America, and South America.

Subspecies
 Tropisternus collaris collaris (Fabricius, 1775)
 Tropisternus collaris mexicanus Laporte, 1840
 Tropisternus collaris proximus Sharp, 1883
 Tropisternus collaris striolatus (LeConte, 1855)
 Tropisternus collaris viridis Young and Spangler, 1956

References

 Hansen, Michael (1999). World Catalogue of Insects, volume 2: Hydrophiloidea (s. str.) (Coleoptera), 416.

Further reading

 Arnett, R.H. Jr., M. C. Thomas, P. E. Skelley and J. H. Frank. (eds.). (2002). American Beetles, Volume II: Polyphaga: Scarabaeoidea through Curculionoidea. CRC Press LLC, Boca Raton, FL.
 Arnett, Ross H. (2000). American Insects: A Handbook of the Insects of America North of Mexico. CRC Press.
 Richard E. White. (1983). Peterson Field Guides: Beetles. Houghton Mifflin Company.

Hydrophilinae
Beetles described in 1775
Taxa named by Johan Christian Fabricius